Perfetti Van Melle is an Italian-Dutch multinational company of confectionery and gum, It was formed in 2001 with the merger of the Perfetti of Italy, and the Van Melle of the Netherlands. Perfetti Van Melle is headquartered in Lainate, Italy, and Breda, Netherlands. Perfetti Van Melle is the sixth largest confectionery manufacturer in the world.  It employs 17,000 people via 30 subsidiary companies and distributes its products in over 159 countries.

Products
Some of the brands are:
Airheads
Alpenliebe
Aprilla
Big Babol
Brooklyn
Center Fresh
Center Shock
Chlormint
Chocoliebe
Chupa Chups
Filly Folly
Frisk
Fruittella
Golia
Happydent
Klene
 Marbels
Meller
Mentos
Smint
Vigorsol
Vivident

References 

 
Companies based in North Holland
Dutch confectionery
Confectionery companies of Italy
Multinational food companies
Multinational companies headquartered in Italy
Food and drink companies established in 2001